Lichen products, also known as lichen substances, are organic compounds produced by a lichen. Specifically, they are secondary metabolites. Lichen products are represented in several different chemical classes, including terpenoids, orcinol derivatives, chromones, xanthones, depsides, and depsidones. Over 800 lichen products of known chemical structure have been reported in the scientific literature, and most of these compound are exclusively found in lichens. Examples of lichen products include usnic acid (a dibenzofuran), atranorin (a depside), lichexanthone (a xanthone), salazinic acid (a depsidone), and isolichenan, an α-glucan. Many lichen products have biological activity, and research into these effects is ongoing.

Lichen products accumulate on the outer walls of the fungal hyphae, and are quite stable. Crystal deposits can be visualised using scanning electron microscopy. For this reason, even very old herbarium specimens can be analysed. The amount of lichen products in lichen (as a percentage of dry weight) is typically between 0.1%–10%, although in some instances it may be as high as 30%. They are usually found in the medulla, or less commonly, the cortex.

Most lichen products are biochemically synthesized via the acetyl-polymalonyl pathway (also known as polyketide pathway), while only a few originate from the mevalonate and shikimate biosynthetic pathways.

In 1907, Wilhelm Zopf identified and classified about 150 lichen products. Seventy years later, this number had risen to 300, and by 1995, 850 lichen products were known; as of 2021, more than 1000 have been identified. Analytical methods were developed in the 1970s using thin-layer chromatography for the routine identification of lichen products. More recently, published techniques demonstrate ways to more efficiently harvest secondary metabolites from lichen samples.

References

Cited literature

Lichenology